The 1971 English cricket season was the 72nd in which the County Championship had been an official competition. India won a Test series in England for the first time. It was a huge surprise at the time because England, having just won the Ashes in Australia, had a very strong team. England also played Pakistan and won that series 1–0. Surrey won the County Championship.

Honours
County Championship - Surrey
Gillette Cup - Lancashire
Sunday League - Worcestershire
Minor Counties Championship - Yorkshire II
Second XI Championship - Hampshire II 
Wisden - Geoff Arnold, Bhagwat Chandrasekhar, Lance Gibbs, Brian Taylor, Zaheer Abbas

Test series

1971 saw India tour England for the second half of the domestic season. After drawing the first two tests at Lord's and Old Trafford, India won the final test at The Oval by four wickets to claim the series 1–0. This was India's first victory on England's soil.

For the first half of the season, England hosted Pakistan. The first two games were drawn, but this time England won the final test at Headingley by 25 runs to take the series 1–0.

County Championship

Gillette Cup

Sunday League

Leading batsmen

Leading bowlers

References

Annual reviews
 Playfair Cricket Annual 1972
 Wisden Cricketers' Almanack 1972

External links
 CricketArchive – season and tournament itineraries

1971 in English cricket
English cricket seasons in the 20th century